Bedek Stream is the 3.2 km long stream on eastern Byers Peninsula, Livingston Island in the South Shetland Islands, Antarctica draining the lakes of Oread and Montemno. It flows northwards along the west side of Urvich Wall and the east side of Tsamblak Hill, crosses Robbery Beaches and empties into Barclay Bay just east of Sparadok Point. The area was visited by early 19th century sealers.

Bedek is a Thracian toponym preserved in the names of Big and Little Bedek Peaks, and Bedechka River in Central Bulgaria.

Location
Detailed Spanish mapping in 1992, and Bulgarian mapping of the area in 2009 and 2017.

Maps
 Península Byers, Isla Livingston. Mapa topográfico a escala 1:25000. Madrid: Servicio Geográfico del Ejército, 1992
 L. Ivanov. Antarctica: Livingston Island and Greenwich, Robert, Snow and Smith Islands. Scale 1:120000 topographic map. Troyan: Manfred Wörner Foundation, 2009. 
 L. Ivanov. Antarctica: Livingston Island and Smith Island. Scale 1:100000 topographic map. Manfred Wörner Foundation, 2017. 
 Antarctic Digital Database (ADD). Scale 1:250000 topographic map of Antarctica. Scientific Committee on Antarctic Research (SCAR). Since 1993, regularly upgraded and updated

See also
 Livingston Island

Notes

References
 Bedek Stream. SCAR Composite Gazetteer of Antarctica
 Bulgarian Antarctic Gazetteer. Antarctic Place-names Commission. (details in Bulgarian, basic data in English)
 Management Plan for Antarctic Specially Protected Area No. 126 Byers Peninsula. Measure 4 (2016), ATCM XXXIX Final Report. Santiago, 2016

External links
 Bedek Stream. Adjusted Copernix satellite image

Bodies of water of Livingston Island
Rivers of Antarctica
Bulgaria and the Antarctic